The 1999–2000 season was the 111th season in the existence of Recreativo de Huelva and the club's second consecutive season in the second division of Spanish football.

Competitions

Overall record

Segunda División

League table

Results summary

Results by round

Matches

Source:

Copa del Rey

First round

References

Recreativo de Huelva seasons
Recreativo